Três Pontas (Three Tips) is a municipality located in southern Minas Gerais state, Brazil. It's a city with about all streets of urban zone paved and services of water and sewage to all people. The municipality has about 57 thousand inhabitants and a population density of 78,12hab/km2. The road MG-167 is the only paved road that passes through the city, but the Rodovia Fernão Dias (BR-381), is less than 50 km from the city centre passing through Varginha.

The municipality don't have a rugged relief (the average level is 900m), there are only three areas in which the altitude reaches 1100m above sea level. One of them is the Serra de Três Pontas (Three Tips Mountain), a place known in the region for its distinctive shape and natural environment. The streams Araras and Espera are the main water courses that pass through the municipality, and they flow into the Furnas Dam. The rivers Verde and Sapucaí pass on the south boundary and flow into Furnas Dam too. The Municipality is located on the basin of the Grande River.

The suave climate favors the growth of coffee, the main economic wealth of the city (known as one of the largest producers of coffee in Brazil).

Etymology

The city name origin is the peculiar shape of the mountain near the city, that was utilized as a reference point by ancient travelers and by the runaway slaves. These slaves  formed near the mountain, the Quilombo do Cascalho which was destroyed some time later.

History

The first inhabitants of the region was the runaway slaves that has formed two quilombos. During the colonization process, it had fights of settlers and slaves and explorers looking for gold. The soil of Três Pontas  has no gold or important mineral resources. So, it was formed farms to create cattle and culture of subsistence.

The chapel of Nossa Senhora d'Ajuda was the start of the locality, founded on October 15, 1768, by the Captain Bento Ferreira de Brito, attracting people scattered around. The locality, with rural and urban characteristics mixed, was formed slowly around the chapel. Três Pontas has supplied the villages that arose with the gold and later the Rio de Janeiro. The locality was elevated to a village in April 1841.

On July 3, 1857, the village received the status of city. With the emergence and affirmation of the coffee, in the mid of the 19th century, and with the creation of roads, Três Pontas reach the international market through Rio de Janeiro and São Paulo ports. Coffee has maintained the city economy ever since. Two persons deserve special mention in the city's history: the Barão da Boa Esperança, influential politician who contributed to the development of the municipality, and Padre Victor, pastor of the city.

Três Pontas also had a rail spur, the Trespontana Railroad, which was inaugurated in 1895, whose terminal was where today is located the City Hall. The railway was closed in 1964 due to, among other reasons, the flooding of part of the line by Furnas Dam.

Geography 

The municipality is limited to the north with Campos Gerais and Santana da Vargem, on south with the municipality of Varginha, Elói Mendes and Paraguaçu, on east with Nepomuceno e Carmo da Cachoeira and west with Campos Gerais. It's located at about 290 kilometers away from Belo Horizonte, the state's capital. According to the map of urban hierarchy produced by the Brazilian Institute of Geography and Statistics, Três Pontas is classified as a B zone center, that means the city has a restricted influence, only over the smaller cities around it. The city is under influence of Varginha that, on the other hand, is under influence of Belo Horizonte.

Relief, soils and rocks

The municipality has a wavy relief, with altitudes between 800 and 900 meters above sea level, with the city located at about 905 meters. However about twenty percent of the municipality is in mountainous regions, in which the height exceeds one thousand meters above sea level. One of these areas is the Serra de Três Pontas (Three Tips Hill), located nineteen kilometers away from the city, where is located the highest point of the municipality, at 1 234 meters above sea level. The lowest point is located on the margins of the Furnas reservoir, at about 770 meters above the sea level.

 Soils
Red/yellow oxisols. According with Brazilian Systems of Soils Classification all (or almost all) oxisols are acidic and nutrient-poor. However, when adjusted and fertilized these soils become highly productive.

Rocks
According to the Geologic Map of Minas Gerais, the soils in the south portion of the municipality have kianite granulite rocks. In the north, it has rocks of the ortogneissics complexes (ortogneisses granitics, granulite, migmatite and anphibolite) and in the region of Três Pontas Mountain the rocks are formed by metapelitic graphitous alternated with quartzite.

Climate
According to IBGE Brazil Climate Map the climate of Três Pontas is Tropical semi-humid, with a dry season that last between four and five months and the average temperature is between 15 °C and 18 °C in at least one month in the year.

During the summer rains are common in the late afternoon. Temperatures at this time are always very high. In the winter the arrival of polar air masses that drop and cause frost. In this time of year the relative humidity is too low, and causes discomfort to the population.

 Hydrography
The municipality is watered by Verde and Sapucaí rivers (dammed in Furnas), belonging to Grand River Drainage. It also has the Araras and Espera streams, that are formed by the joining of several smaller streams. The Arara stream rises near the town and moves west to flow into the reservoir of Furnas. The Espera stream rises near the Três Pontas Mountain and flows into Furnas near a farm with the same name. Other streams that rises on the north of Três Pontas Mountain go north and flow into Rio Grande.

Biome
Três Pontas is in the transition area between the biome Mata Atlântica and the biome Cerrado. The original vegetation of the Municipality is highly modified because of coffee production, but some woods still remain.

Urban Area

 Water and sewage connections
The water and sewage service is by S.A.A.E. (Serviço Autônomo de Água e Esgoto, Water and Sewage Autonomous System). Três Pontas has 12644 water connections, that means 100% of urban area homes served with treated water.

The sewage system serves 12572 homes, that means 99.2% of houses have access to the sewage system, that put the city among the cities with better sanitation in Brazil.

In the municipality, 14004 homes have water connections, 1776 draw water from wells or springs on their own property and 263 have other forms of obtaining water.

 Electric power
Electrical power is supplied by CEMIG (Compania Energética de Minas Gerais, or Energetic Company of Minas Gerais).

 Paving and fleet
Três Pontas has about 98% of paved streets in the urban area. Due to the fleet growing in the last years, there is a lack of parking lots in downtown and in peak hours, the traffic becomes slow in some streets.

Urban transportation
The city has bus lines that serve almost all neighborhoods of the urban area.

Streams that cross the urban area
The urban area is crossed for the streams Candongas, Custodinho, Bambus and Quatis. All of them are tributaries of Araras stream.

Census 2010
According to the census, there are 18517 houses in the municipality, that totalize 21819 addresses, being 3474 in the countryside and 18345 in the urban area.

Still according to 2010 census, 15474 homes are houses (96.5%), 526 are apartments (3.3%) and 40 belongs to a condominium (0.2%).

Urban Hierarchy
According with the map of Urban Hierarchy of Brazil, Três Pontas is classified as a center of zone B, that means the city has a small regional influence, restricted to small cities which Três Pontas is bordered. The city is under influence of Varginha that, on the other hand, is under influence of Belo Horizonte.

Três Pontas is today the greatest producer of coffee in the country.  There are more than 50 million coffee trees in an area of approximately 300 square kilometres, producing an average of 400 thousand sacks each harvest.

Transport
 Access Roads

Três Pontas is crossed by the state highway MG-167 giving access to BR-491 (passing through Varginha) and BR-265 (passing through Santana da Vargem). Both federal highways give access to Rodovia Fernão Dias (BR-381).

There is a project for creation of the road Três Pontas - Paraguaçu passing through Pontalete and other for creation of the road Três Pontas - Carmo da Cachoeira.

 Air Access
The city has the Leda Mello Resende Airport
, 3 km from downtown, with paved runway, measuring 1,150m in length by 20m in width, which allows for the landing and takeoff of small and medium-sized planes.
Airlines from Varginha : TAE, TAM, TAV.

Rural Roads
The municipality is crossed by more than 300 km of rural roads, mostly in good condition. Through these routes is possible get directly to Campos Gerais, Nepomuceno, Carmo da Cachoeira and Paraguaçu (passing through Pontalete crossing the Furnas Dam by a ferry line)

Navigation
It's possible arrive to the Pontalete district by boat, because the district is watered by Furnas Dam.

Population
According to the 2010 census, 50.4%(27155) of Três Pontas population are women, and 49.6%(26705) are men.

Color or race

Municipal Human Development Index
MHDI: .773
State ranking: 152 out of 853 municipalities
National ranking: 1,251 out of 5,138 municipalities
Life expectancy: 72
Literacy rate: 88 For the complete list see Frigoletto

Economy 
The municipal economy is mixed, but coffee is the most important economic product.

Agriculture 
The planting is diverse, but the coffee plantations occupy most of the cultivated area. There is in the city more than 30 million coffee trees planted in an area of 24 thousand hectares, being the largest national producer.
About 75% of coffee production is marketed by the Cooperativa dos Cafeicultores da Zona de Três Pontas.
In the city are also planted corn, beans and vegetables, among others.
In 2010, 29808 tons of coffee were harvested (about 1% of national production), with an average yield 1440 kg/ha, a total amount of R$157 982 000. In comparation with 2009, the total production dropped 1.8%.

Permanent farming

Temporary Farming

Animal production (Animal numbers)

Industry
Três Pontas has an Industrial park, with small and medium industries:
fertilizer industry, agricultural machinery, fabrics, plastic ware, precast products, metalwork, furniture, roasting, baking, graphics, stills and other miscellaneous.

Besides the growth of tourism in the region driven by the dam and farm hotels.

Services 
The services correspond to 62% of GNP of the municipality . The trade contributes significantly to the growth of the city.
 Commercial establishments by activity
 Restaurants / Bars - 315
 Hotels and others - 06
 Coffee shops, Bakeries and Ice Cream– 78
 Gas stations with services- 12
 Markets – 152
 Obs.: Total number of registered taxpayers in the municipality in various brands of activity: 3938

Public Health

About 58% of health facilities are in the responsibility of the municipality. The other 42% are private. The city has a Pronto Atendimento Municipal (Municipal Emergency Services), which attends to the urgent and emergency cases. It also has the Hospital São Francisco de Assis (St. Francis Hospital), which has about 100 beds, surgical, obstetric, pediatric, ICU and medical clinic . The hospital also offers radiology services, ultrasound, sterilization center and clinic.

 Health care
The Department of Health of Três Pontas manages various clinics scattered throughout neighborhoods.
 Center for Health Catumbi (Centro de Saúde Catumbi)
 Padre Victor Health Center (Centro de Saúde Padre Victor)
 Health Centre St. Edwirges (Centro de Saúde Santa Edwirges)
 Health Center Marilena Village (Centro de Saúde Vila Marilena)
 Center for Health Polyclinic (Centro de Saúde Policlínica)
There are also centers in rural communities and periodic visits.

The Municipal Pharmacy provides medications to low income families.

The Municipal Health Department also carries out periodic preventive campaigns for public awareness about the prevention of various diseases, especially dengue.

Três Pontas has a Centre of Ophthalmology and a dental center, both with free care for low income families.

There are also several private clinics in several areas of health.

According to the 2010 Census, there are 51 health facilities public and private in Three Points.

Education

About 45% are on elementary school, 41% on kindergarten and 14% on high school.

Elementary and high school
Most schools are under the responsibility of Municipal Secretary of Education. The city has 14 municipal schools on urban area (being 11 day care centers and kindergarten school, 1 of 1st to 3rd grade, 1 of 1st to 5th grade and 1 of 1st to 9th grade) and 8 on rural zone (being 6 from 1st to 5th grade and 1 kindergarten).

The city has four state schools (that have students from 6th to 9th grade and high school) and four private school (that have students from kindergarten to high school).

University
Centro Universitário do Sul de Minas (University Center of South Minas).

Vocational courses
Três Pontas has many schools with vocational courses to serve young people wishing to enter the labor market. A professional school of the SEST/SENAT is also being built.

According to the 2010 census, there are 34 schools in Três Pontas.

Culture

Celso Brant Public Library
Administrated by Culture, Leisure and Tourism Secretary, the library has more than 20 thousand books. It was created in 1959.

Heitor Vila Lobos Municipal Music School
School of Guitar, Violin, Cello, Piano, Keyboard, Accordion, Sweet Flute, Flute, Saxophone, Drums, Guitar, Choir, Canto Single, Music Perception, Practice Set, Musicalization Music and Image. It was established in 1987.

 Milton Nascimento Cultural Center
Theatre which presents the main cultural events of the city.

Sports and Tourism

Sports
The Sports Municipal Secretary arranges several events to promote sports in the city. Among these are: karate classes, football and volleyball for children and teenagers.

There are also many championships among teams of schools and neighborhoods.

The main football matches are played at Ítalo Tomagnini Municipal Stadium, but there are other football fields in other neighborhoods. Other sports, like futsal and volleyball are played at the Gymnasium Aureliano Chaves.

Tourism
In Três Pontas the preferred tourist destination is the Pontalete District, because of the Furnas Dam. Perfect for those who like water sports, the district has many good bars and restaurants.

Other people can visit the Três Pontas (Three tips) Mountain that's about 19 km from city. On the mountain there are many trails, some waterfalls and even a wall made by the slaves.

In the city there are several bars and restaurants that have good food. At weekends the downtown is very busy with parties and people on squares.

On the road between Três Pontas and Varginha, the tourist can visit the Pedra Negra Hotel Farm and visit the Coffee Museum, that show how the coffee culture was.

Religion 
Most people, are Catholic.

The city has three parishes
Parish Nossa Senhora d'Ajuda (Our Lady of Help) .

The main church is the Matriz Nossa Senhora d'Ajuda Church, in downtown, where are the remains of Padre Victor.
Parish Nossa Senhora Aparecida (Our Lady of Aparecida)
The main church is Aparecida Church
Parish Cristo Redentor
The main church is Nossa Senhora das Graças (Our Lady of Graces) Church (known as Catumbi Church).

The three parishes belong to the Diocese of Campanha.

Communication 
Radio Station
Sentinela FM - 99.9 MHz

Community Radio Liberdade FM - 87.9 MHz

Radio Três Pontas - AM 1540 kHz

Transamérica Hits - Fm 92.5 MHz

Newspaper
Jornal Correio Trespontano (Trespontano Mail Newspaper)

Events 
 City's Anniversary: July 3

Commemorated with shows and parties

 Expocafé': June

One of the biggest events of the coffee growing country, where millions of dollars are moved, and the event grows every year. In 2012 was held between June 19 and June 22.

 Festival Música do Mundo (Music of the World'' Festival): September CANCELED 2011
 Priest Victor party: September 23

References

External links

 IBGE
 AluguelTP - Aluguel de casas, aptos e salas comerciais em Três Pontas
 CicloTP - Ciclism and trailsin Três Pontas and region
 Prefeitura Municipal - Prefeitura Municipal de Três Pontas.
 Blog do Silvano Alves - Blog that shows the news of Três Pontas.
  Câmara Municipal de Três Pontas - Camara of Três Pontas
 Map of Três Pontas on Google Maps
 Map of Três Pontas on Google Map Maker
 COCATREL

 
1768 establishments in Brazil
Populated places established in 1768
Municipalities in Minas Gerais